Taman Seremban Jaya (Jawi: تامن سرمبن جاي;tamil ) is a suburb of Seremban, near Senawang in Negeri Sembilan, Malaysia. It is located about 5 kilometres from Seremban city centre. It is served by the Senawang Komuter station, but it is also not far from the Sungai Gadut station.

References

Populated places in Negeri Sembilan